29th BSFC Awards
December 14, 2008

Best Film (TIE): 
Slumdog MillionaireandWALL-E
The 29th Boston Society of Film Critics Awards, honoring the best in filmmaking in 2008, were given on December 14, 2008.

Winners

Best Film (TIE):
Slumdog Millionaire
WALL-E
Runner-up: Milk
Best Actor (TIE):
Sean Penn – Milk
Mickey Rourke – The Wrestler
Runner-up (TIE): Richard Jenkins – The Visitor and Frank Langella – Frost/Nixon
Best Actress:
Sally Hawkins – Happy-Go-Lucky
Runner-up: Anne Hathaway – Rachel Getting Married
Best Supporting Actor:
Heath Ledger – The Dark Knight
Runner-up: Robert Downey Jr. – Tropic Thunder
Best Supporting Actress:
Penélope Cruz – Vicky Cristina Barcelona
Runner-up: Viola Davis – Doubt
Best Director:
Gus Van Sant – Milk and Paranoid Park
Best Screenplay:
Dustin Lance Black – Milk
Runner-up: Mike Leigh – Happy-Go-Lucky
Best Cinematography:
Christopher Doyle and Rain Kathy Li – Paranoid Park
Runner-up: Anthony Dod Mantle – Slumdog Millionaire
Best Documentary:
Man on Wire
Runner-up: Young @ Heart
Best Foreign-Language Film:
Let the Right One In (Låt den rätte komma in) • Sweden
Runner-up: Waltz with Bashir (Vals Im Bashir) • Israel
Best Animated Film:
WALL-E
Runner-up: Waltz with Bashir (Vals Im Bashir)
Best Editing:
Chris Dickens – Slumdog Millionaire
Best New Filmmaker:
Martin McDonagh – In Bruges
Best Ensemble Cast:
Tropic Thunder
Runner-up: The Visitor

External links
 Past Winners

References
 Boston critics hand out honors Variety
 Pair tops Boston critics' list Boston Globe

2008
Boston Society Of Film Critics Awards
Boston Society of Film Critics Awards
Boston Society of Film Critics Awards
December 2008 events in the United States